Patrice Pastor (born 1973),  is a Monegasque businessman and property developer. He serves as the Chairman of J.B. Pastor & Fils.

Early life
Patrice Pastor was born in 1973. 

He is the great grandson of the company founder, the real-estate mogul Jean-Baptiste Pastor.

Career
Pastor serves as the Chairman of J.B. Pastor & Fils.  He is also the head of Pastor Real Estate, based in one the Pastor Group's Mayfair properties at 48 Curzon Street, London.

He was the owner of the weekly L'Observateur de Monaco until 2010.

References

Living people
1973 births
Monegasque businesspeople in real estate
Patrice